Global Medical Device Nomenclature (GMDN) is a system of internationally agreed generic descriptors used to identify all medical device products. This nomenclature is a naming system for products which include those used for the diagnosis, prevention, monitoring, treatment or alleviation of disease or injury in humans.

The main purpose of the GMDN is to provide health authorities / regulators, health care providers, conformity assessment bodies and others with a single generic naming system.

Medical device experts from around the world (manufacturers, healthcare authorities and regulators) compiled the GMDN, based on the international standard ISO 15225.

Governance
The GMDN meets the need to identify medical devices at the global level, as identified in the Global Harmonization Task Force (GHTF) that have since disbanded (2012) and replaced by the IMDRF

GMDN is managed by the GMDN Agency, a non-profit organization and Registered Charity, which reports to its Board of Trustees, that represent medical device regulators and industry.

Structure
The GMDN term is in the form of a 5-digit numeric GMDN Code cross-referenced to a specific Term Name and Definition, with which all specific medical devices having substantially similar generic features, can be identified. The following is an example:

 GMDN Term Name - "Scalpel, single-use"
 GMDN Code - "47569"
 GMDN Definition - "A sterile, hand-held, manual surgical instrument constructed as a one-piece handle and scalpel blade (not an exchangeable component) used by the operator to manually cut or dissect tissue. The blade is typically made of high-grade stainless steel alloy or carbon steel and the handle is often made of plastic. This is a single-use device."

The GMDN term and other associated data is copyright protected and the GMDN is a Trademark.

Uniquely each GMDN term has a set of attributes, known as Collective Terms, which help to navigate the GMDN Database and aid the selection of a GMDN term by medical condition or product feature.

The GMDN is used by regulators, healthcare providers and others for activities such as medical device recalls, adverse event reporting and postmarket surveillance and monitoring, as well as inventory control and other healthcare management functions.

The GMDN Agency updates the GMDN utilizing member change requests, to add a new generic device term or to change an existing Term Name or Definition. The decisions are made by an international expert team, according to ISO 15225. The GMDN Agency releases updates to the GMDN on a daily basis, on their interactive website, the GMDN Database. Only Members have access to the GMDN Database. Since 1 April 2019 GMDN membership and therefore access to GMDN Terms and Codes has been free of any charge. The GMDN is available in English and other languages.

International use
The GMDN is part of the 'minimum data set' of the US FDA Unique Device Identification regulation for the registration of new Medical Devices intended for use in the United States. This follows the international consensus established by the International Medical Device Regulators Forum (IMDRF).

The GMDN is required by the UK's national medical device regulator, the Medicines and Healthcare products Regulatory Agency

The government agency responsible for medical device safety in Australia Therapeutic Goods Administration require the GMDN when registering a product within its ARTG system

The GMDN Agency has established long term cooperation with the IHTSDO. The Cooperation Agreement shall result in the use of the GMDN as the medical device component of SNOMED CT. This Agreement is consistent with the aims of both organisations to minimise duplication and to support harmonisation. The following objectives were agreed:

 A more comprehensive and harmonised clinical terminology
 Greater utility and access to both terminologies
 Opportunities to improve organisational efficiencies

The Agreement will benefit patients across the world and all users of SNOMED CT and the GMDN in promoting comprehensive terminology based medical records, covering the needs of regulators, the medical device industry and healthcare professionals. The arrangement will enhance the application of care to individual patients for medical device, patient risk and safety use cases.

See also
 Unique Device Identification
 IHTSDO - International Health Terminology Standards Development Organisation
 Meddra - Terminology for the pharmaceutical industry.
 Medical device

References

External links
 GMDN Agency  - More information about GMDN

Medical classification
Health standards